Being an indigenous tribe in Borneo, the Kayan people are similar to their neighbours, the Kenyah tribe, with which they are grouped together with the Bahau people under the Apo Kayan people group. The Kayan people are categorised as a part of the Dayak people. They are distinct from, and not to be confused with, the Kayan people of Myanmar.

The population of the Kayan ethnic group may be around 200,000. They are part of a larger grouping of people referred collectively as the Orang Ulu, or upriver people. Like some other Dayak people, they are known for being fierce warriors, former headhunters, adept in Upland rice cultivation, and having extensive tattoos and stretched earlobes amongst both sexes.

History

They may have originated from along the Kayan river in the North Kalimantan province of Borneo. They live along the upper Kayan and the middle Kapuas and Mahakam rivers. They seem to have expanded to the south in Sarawak in historic times, generating some conflicts with the Iban that were expanding north at the same time. They have settled in Sarawak on the middle Baram River, the Bintulu River and along the Rajang River, having been pressed back a little during the late 19th century. In 1863 West Kalimantan, Iban people migrated to the upstreams of Saribas River and Rejang River and started to attack the Kayan people in those areas and continued doing so northwards and later eastwards. Wars and headhunting attacks have caused many other tribes to be displaced, including the Kayan people, who make up of 1.4% of the West Kutai Regency population. Significant expansion to the east Borneo also occurred during the historical times, the conversion of the Kayan people to Islam forming the ethnogenesis of the Bulungan people.

Language
The Kayan language belongs to the Malayo-Polynesian branch of the Austronesian language family.

Main activities

Their basic culture is similar to the other Dayak people in Borneo. Their agriculture was based upon shifting cultivation techniques and the cultivation of Upland rice. Other farming such as sago, corn, yams, pumpkin and tobacco are also cultivated. During the years of famine, sago is mined. Fishing (killing fish with poisons) plays an important role, and a smaller role is played by hunting with a sumpitan. The Kayan people are engaged in breeding pigs and chickens, while dogs are kept for ritual purposes. The Kayan people are known as excellent blacksmiths (the Kayan Mandau swords are the main item of exchange), boat builders and carpenters. Loom, weaving, production of tans, arts, wood carving, making of masks and pottery are also developed.

Social structure

Traditionally, they live in long houses on river banks. Their settlement consists of one or several long houses as long as 300 meters, which can accommodate up to 100 families (400–600 people) and consist of a common veranda and rooms. Residents of a long house constitute a tribal community. The Kayan people are divided into three endogamous caste-estate groups; "house owning group" or aristocrat (ipun uma or keta'u), community members or commoners (panyin) and slaves (lupau). Among the nobility, marriages are usually outside of the community, often with other tribes; while community members and slaves usually marry within the community. The leader is usually elected from the nobility class (in the 19th century, he also served as a military leader). The settlement is bi-localized, and the filiation is bilateral, while the system of kinship is of the English model.

Religion
The Kayan people developed a religion and a complex cult (bounty hunting and human sacrifices that disappeared at the beginning of the 20th century, as well as shamanism). The core event was the feast of collected heads (mamat), during which warrior initiations and funeral ceremonies were held. In the 20th century, some Kayan people were converted to Christianity.

Culture

Traditional Kayan song
 Alam Lening (Dayak Kayaan Mendalam, Kalbar)
 Lung Kayaan Mendalam

Notable people
 Francisca Luhong James - Miss Universe Malaysia 2020 and a part-time model. She is of mixed Kayan, Kenyah and Iban lineage.

References

Further reading 
 Into the Art of Borneo: The Kenyah-Kayan Tradition
 

Ethnic groups in Indonesia
Ethnic groups in Sarawak
Dayak people
Headhunting